Simon Jones may refer to:
Simon Jones (actor) (born 1950), English actor
Simon Jones (cricketer) (born 1978), Welsh cricketer who plays for England
Simon Jones (footballer) (born 1945), former Rochdale and Chester City player
Simon Jones (musician) (born 1972), British musician, member of The Verve
Simon Cellan Jones (born 1963), British television and film director
Simon Hewitt Jones, English violinist
Simon Huw Jones (born 1960), vocalist, lyric writer and photographer
Simon Peyton Jones (born 1958), British computer scientist

See also 
Simon Bucher-Jones (born 1964), author, poet and amateur actor